The Yevpatoria City Municipality (translit. Yevpatoriis'ka mis'krada) is one of the 25 regions of the Autonomous Republic of Crimea, a territory recognized by almost all countries as part of Ukraine but occupied by Russia as the Republic of Crimea. The region is located on the western coast of Crimea on the Black Sea's shore. Its administrative center is the city of Yevpatoria. Population:

Name
Colloquially, the municipality is known as "the territory governed by the Yevpatoria City Council.

History
The Yevpatoria City Municipality was formed on February 11, 1963 when the territory of the Yevpatoria Raion was absorbed into the already existing Saky Raion. At that time, the Yevpatoria municipality was established with the city of Yevpatoria governing the territory. The municipality was reestablished on May 1, 1990.

Demographics
The Yevpatoria City Municipality's population was 117,565 as of the 2001 Ukrainian Census and 123,505 as of April 1, 2013.

The region's nationality composition results of the 2001 census was as follows: 
 Russians—64.9 percent
 Ukrainians—23.3 percent
 Crimean Tatars—6.9 percent
All of the other nationalities took up the remaining 4.9 percent.

Administrative and municipal status
Within the framework of administrative divisions of Russia, Yevpatoria is, together with a number of urban and rural localities, incorporated separately as the town of republican significance of Yevpatoriya—an administrative unit with the status equal to that of the districts. As a municipal division, the town of republican significance of Yevpatoriya is incorporated as Yevpatoriya Urban Okrug.

Within the framework of administrative divisions of Ukraine, Yevpatoria is incorporated as the town of republican significance of Yevpatoria. Ukraine does not have municipal divisions.

Besides the city of Yevpatoria which serves as the region's administrative center, the Yevpatoria municipality also includes three urban-type settlements: 
 Myrnyi, a remote enclave on the Black Sea's coast surrounded by Saky Raion
 Novoozerne, inland remote enclave surrounded by Saky Raion
 Zaozerne, situated by the Black Sea's coast near Yevpatoria

References

External links
 
 

 
Municipalities of Crimea